Arctic blue may refer to:

Arctic blue (Agriades glandon), a species of butterfly
Arctic Blue, a 1993 movie by Peter Masterson